is a former Nippon Professional Baseball pitcher for the Hiroshima Toyo Carp in Japan's Central League.

External links

Living people
1980 births
Baseball people from Hiroshima
Asia University (Japan) alumni
Japanese baseball players
Nippon Professional Baseball pitchers
Hiroshima Toyo Carp players
Japanese baseball coaches
Nippon Professional Baseball coaches